Albert Biedermann (born 1926)  is an Argentine athlete who competed in the 1948 Summer Olympics in the 4 × 100 m relay in which they finished 3rd in the first round and failed to advance.

References
Alberto Biedermann's profile at Sports Reference.com

External links
 

1926 births
Possibly living people
Argentine male sprinters
Olympic athletes of Argentina
Athletes (track and field) at the 1948 Summer Olympics
20th-century Argentine people